Ellie Jane Price (born 23 March 1983) is a British television political journalist.

Biography
Price was born in Haywards Heath, West Sussex. She has a younger sister (born 1986). She studied for a BSc in Politics at the University of Bristol from 2001–04, and for a PgDip in Broadcast Journalism at Cardiff University from 2005–06.

From 2007–10 she worked for the Press Association (PA).

She worked for ITV from October 2010 to December 2012. She worked for ITV Anglia, for ITV News Anglia in Norwich.

She joined the BBC as a political reporter in February 2012. She worked at BBC South East.

She enjoys running marathons.

References

External links
 BBC biography

1983 births
Alumni of Cardiff University
Alumni of the University of Bristol
BBC newsreaders and journalists
British political journalists
British women television journalists
ITV regional newsreaders and journalists
People from Haywards Heath
Living people
British radio presenters
British women radio presenters